Casimir "Casey" Kendziorski (December 3, 1898September 26, 1974) was a Polish American immigrant, machinist, and Democratic politician.  He was a member of the Wisconsin State Senate for 28 years, representing Milwaukee.  He also served two years in the Wisconsin State Assembly.

Biography
Kendziorski was born in what is now western Poland.  At the time of his birth, this was the Province of Posen in the Kingdom of Prussia, within the German Empire.  He received a primary school education in his native Poland and attended evening school classes after moving to Milwaukee.  From 1928 to 1930 he worked as a real estate broker, then worked as a machinist.

He was elected to the Wisconsin State Assembly in 1946, representing Milwaukee County's 5th district, and was reelected in 1948.  The 1948 election also saw State Senator Clement J. Zablocki elected to the United States House of Representatives, leaving his 3rd Senate district seat vacant.  Kenziorski ran in the April 1949 special election to fill the Senate vacancy and prevailed with 62% of the vote.

He was a member of the Polish National Alliance and a past vice-president of his local trade union. He was active in civic and labor activities.

Kendziorski served in the Senate until his death in September 1974.  He maintained a near-perfect voting record in the Senate until February 1973, when he had to enter a nursing home due to poor health.  He was taken from the nursing home to a Milwaukee hospital after suffering a pulmonary embolism that migrated from his leg into his lung.  He died September 26, 1974.

See also
List of Polish Americans

References

External links

Wisconsin state senators
Members of the Wisconsin State Assembly
Politicians from Milwaukee
1898 births
1974 deaths
Polish emigrants to the United States
20th-century American politicians